The Pentlatch or Pentl’ach or Puntlatch or Puntledge language is a Salishan language that was spoken on Canada's Vancouver Island in a small area between Comox and Nanaimo, British Columbia.  The Pentlatch people formerly numbered at least 3,000 with at least 90 settlements in the area. The language became extinct in the 1940s after the death of the last fluent speaker in 1940.

There is one known semi-speaker (if not full speaker, source unclear), Quallicum Chief Bill Recalma. He and his son Jessie have been working together to help revive it. The Pentlatch celebrated a ceremony celebrating the language's reawakening due to their efforts.

Variants
The name of this people and their language survives on the modern map as that of the Puntledge River, the Comox Valley locality of Puntledge and the name of the Pentledge 2 Indian Reserve, now allocated to the K'ómoks First Nation band government.

References

External links
Pentlatch bibliography from the Yinka Dene Language Institute
"Pentlatch" at ethnologue.com
"Pentlatch" at native-languages.org

Extinct languages of North America
Coast Salish languages
Mid Vancouver Island
Languages extinct in the 1940s
1940s disestablishments in North America